Night Club is a 1945 crime thriller novel by the British writer Peter Cheyney. It is often better known by its alternative title Dressed to Kill, the name by which it was published in the United States and subsequent British versions. As with other Cheyney novels it features a hardboiled hero, and dialogue influenced by American-based writers such as Raymond Chandler.

Synopsis
In immediate postwar London's swanky West End private detective Rufus Gaunt becomes mixed up in a case of murder at a celebrated night spot.

References

Bibliography
 Reilly, John M. Twentieth Century Crime & Mystery Writers. Springer, 2015.

1945 British novels
Novels by Peter Cheyney
British thriller novels
British crime novels
Novels set in London